Solnhofia is a genus of extinct thalassochelydian turtle from the Late Jurassic of Germany. The type species is Solnhofia parsonsi, named by Gaffney in 1975 for a partial skull and jaw from the early Tithonian of the Solnhofen Formation in Bavaria. Additional material including a complete skeleton is known from the late Kimmeridgian of Switzerland and the Kimmeridgian/Tithonian of other deposits within Bavaria, and potentially also unprepared material from the Late Jurassic of France. The genus was referred to the family Eurysternidae by Anquetin and colleagues in 2017, which may represent an artificial grade of early thalassochelydians. In 2020 a new species Solnhofia brachyrhyncha was described from the Kimmeridigan aged Reuchenette Formation of Switzerland.

References

Thalassochelydia
Prehistoric turtle genera
Kimmeridgian genera
Tithonian genera
Late Jurassic turtles
Late Jurassic reptiles of Europe
Jurassic Germany
Fossils of Germany
Solnhofen fauna
Jurassic Switzerland
Fossils of Switzerland
Fossil taxa described in 1975
Taxa named by Eugene S. Gaffney